List of thriller films released in the 2000s.

Notes

2000s
Thriller